Kishkindha is a kingdom of the vanaras in Hinduism. It is ruled by King Sugriva, the younger brother of Vali, in the Sanskrit epic Ramayana. According to the Hindu epic, this was the kingdom that Sugriva ruled with the assistance of his counsellor, Hanuman.

During the Treta Yuga, the whole region was within the dense Dandaka Forest which was founded by King Danda, son of Ikshvaku, and descendant of Vaivasvata Manu in the Satya Yuga, which extended from the Vindhya range to the South Indian peninsula. Thus, this kingdom was considered that of the vanaras. During the Dvapara Yuga, the Pandava Sahadeva is stated to have visited this kingdom in the epic Mahabharata during his southern military campaign to collect tribute for Yudhishthira's Rajasuya sacrifice.

Literature

Ramayana 
The Ramayana has a book that is based in Kishkindha, known as the Kishkinda Kanda. In this text, a banished Sugriva sends his trusted counsellor, Hanuman, to meet the mysterious Rama and Lakshmana. Satisfied with their noble demeanour, he brings them to Sugriva. The two parties exchange their tales, after which Rama forges an alliance with the former vanara monarch:

Sugriva, in turn, shows the cloak and jewels of Sita that had descended from the sky upon his kingdom during her abduction by Ravana. After Sugriva regales the tales of his brother's exploits, he goes to challenge his brother for a duel, having sought Rama's assistance in the fight. When Rama does not loose his arrow, Sugriva flees towards the Rishyamuka hill, where his brother dared not venture. Rama explains that he did not intercede since he could not distinguish between the two, upon which a wreath of flowers was placed around the vanara's neck. The entourage then visit the hermitage of Saptajanas:

Ignoring his wife Tara's pleas to make peace with Rama, Bali sets out to duel his brother once more, and is slain by Rama's arrow to his breast. Vali and Rama engage in a conversation about the morality of Rama's actions, to which Rama retorts that the vanara had conducted himself in a heinous manner by forcefully bedding Ruma, Sugriva's wife. Even as Tara laments, Sugriva is installed as king once more. However, four months later, he fails to honour his pledge to support Rama's rescue, lost in his blissful dalliance with Tara. A furious Lakshmana, first mollified by Tara, reproaches Sugriva for his conduct, after which he reconciles with him. Sugriva assembles his vanara forces and commands them to venture into the following regions:

The vanara army then venture out of Kishkindha to scour these regions for Sita.

Mahabharata 
Sahadeva's conflict with the kings of Kishkindha is mentioned in the Mahabharata:

Garuda Purana 
Brahma mentions Kishkindha while narrating the Ramayanam:

In popular culture 

 This kingdom is often identified to be the region around the Tungabhadra river (then known as Pampa Sarovara) near Hampi in present-day Vijayanagara district, Karnataka. The mountain near the river known as Rishimukha, where Sugriva lived with Hanuman during his exile, bears the same name.

 The Anjaneyadri Hill is held by the locals to the birthplace of Hanuman.

See also 
Sugriva
Vali
Hanuman

References 

 Kishkinda: Literature and Archaeology
 Complete Ramacharitamanas text 

Kingdoms in the Mahabharata
Kingdoms in the Ramayana